Sargis Manasyan was an Armenian politician who served as acting Minister of Interior of First Republic of Armenia in 1919. He was also member of Armenian Revolutionary Federation party.

References 

Interior ministers of Armenia
Armenian Revolutionary Federation politicians